Staszel is a Polish-language surname. Originally it was a given name derived from the name Stanislaw, diminutive: Stach.  Notable people with the surname include:

Jan Staszel,  Polish cross-country male skier
 (1912-1988), Polish cross-country male skier, 8 times champion of Poland

References

Polish-language surnames